Lindsay Benedict is an artist living in New York City who works in Super 8 and 16mm film, performance, sound, text and painting. Her works explore cultural boundaries through intimate relationships. She is also an adjunct professor in the Fine Arts department at Parsons, The New School in New York City.

Selected Works and Exhibitions 
Carrying (you) at ZARATAN Arte Contemporanea in Lisbon, Portugal was an open studio presentation about the grief of heartbreak and a maternal transformation. The artist works with drips of water on paper and in an audio document, a process that is slow and accumulative. Carrying (you) was accompanied by an audio field soundtrack entitled 9 months of slow drops and public presentations such as an artist talk and a live DJ set (during COVID-19), entitled Ciclo ÑDjs #97: 1-cent black on magenta.

How to Dance a group exhibition at BronxArtSpace in New York City with collaborator Julia Brown. Curated by Phyllis Rosenzweig, the exhibition plays with movement, gesture and discipline in document and plan; it also includes artists Mark Bradford, Klara Liden, and Glendalys Medina.
 
KINDREDS: a song about animals performed at Danspace with Letitia Spangler. The work celebrates ‘play’ and emotional wisdom while pushing deeper into concepts of intimacy and co-dependency. Lindsay Benedict and Letitia Spangler sought out behaviors that are present in both humans and animals.

dirty domestic a solo exhibition at Martina Johnston  gallery in the Bay Area of California in which the artist shares works that present her own body as a site of pleasure and conflict. The exhibition presented projects in various media, including 16mm films, audio installations, photography, and painting that presents parallels between the various interior settings in which her work was created, and the artist-run gallery in which it was exhibited.

Are you There? Yes. Are you there? Yes. a photograph essay exhibited in Banff, Canada and at PARMER gallery  in Bedstuy, Brooklyn. It is an installation of still images. On 16mm moving image film, Benedict documented two people performing a repetitive action of checking to see if the other is there. One reaching for the other, over and over again. The film was transferred into digital video then specific digital stills were chosen and arranged into vertical diptychs.

VECCHIO MERDA DANZBAND is a collective that formed in Turin when the four core members Lindsay Benedict (US), Lia Cecchin (IT), Daniella Isamit Morales (VN) and Lisa Perrucci (IT) all met regularly and speaking in three different languages –Italian, Spanish and English. They performed SUPERLIKERS at Centrale Fies an hour-long performance of melancholic songs, instructional dance steps and purposeless karaoke.

Baby, I just want to dance Twelve unknown dances performed in the parking lot of Le Confort Moderne in Poitiers, France. Lindsay Benedict held an open-call to the local public and used a battery powered boom-box for music. Anyone was invited to perform, auditions were never held, and the dancers brought their own music on the evening of the event.

Collections 

 Artist book, I Called to You  Your Name by Lindsay Benedict in the University of California, Berkeley Art History and Classics library 
 DVD, What's love got to do with it? in the University of California, Berkeley Library, Media Resources Center
 DVD, Real live people in the University of California, Berkeley Library, Media Resources Center 
 Monographie, I Called to You  Your Name by Lindsay Benedict in the Bibliothèque Angoulême, École européenne supérieure de l’image
 Film, You Coated Me with a Layer of Fat Sélection Oodaaq 2012, edition.

External links
Official artist website of Lindsay L Benedict -- lindsayasitcontinues.info 

Edition of 25 Risograph 'Golden Arrowhead' prints, from Lindsay Benedict's "Carrying (you)" fine art presentation at Zaratan Arte Contemporânea

Audio interview on Yale radio "30 minute interview with Lindsay Benedict" by Brainard Carey

Interview in Critical Correspondence "Lindsay Benedict in Conversation with Will Rawls"

Review of solo show on DailyServing, "Lindsay Benedict: dirty domestic at Martina }{ Johnston gallery"

Texts as a contributing writer for HyperAllergic.com 

Contributing artist to Shifter magazine: 22: Dictionary of the Possible; 16: Pluripotential; 15: Will; 14: On Certainty; 12: Unassigned

"Lectures with Lindsay" audio project for ATC, Art, Technology, and Culture Lecture Series, UC Berkeley

Sources cited 

21st-century American women artists
Living people
American performance artists
Year of birth missing (living people)
Williams College alumni